Damián Emiliano Martínez (born 2 September 1992) is an Argentine professional footballer who plays as a goalkeeper for Premier League club Aston Villa and the Argentina national team.

Martínez trained at Independiente's youth ranks before moving to Premier League club Arsenal in 2010. At Arsenal, he initially served as understudy, being loaned to various clubs, before breaking into the starting line-up in 2019, featuring in the Premier League and helping the club win a FA Cup and FA Community Shield. In September 2020, Martínez moved to fellow Premier League club Aston Villa in a transfer worth £20 million. In his first season at the club, he kept a club record 15 clean sheets in the Premier League.

Martínez had represented Argentina in junior international matches. He played on under-17 and under-20 levels. He earned his first senior cap for the Argentina team in 2021, helping his nation win the 2021 Copa América, winning the Golden Glove trophy and keeping a clean sheet in the final. Martínez went on to win the 2022 FIFA World Cup, when he also won the best goalkeeper of the FIFA World Cup award, the Golden Glove for his performance in the tournament. For these achievements, he was named The Best FIFA Goalkeeper in 2022.

Club career

Independiente
Born in Mar del Plata, Martínez started his career playing for Independiente's youth side. In 2009, shortly after his 17th birthday, he was invited to trial at Arsenal, and was initially offered a youth contract.

Arsenal

2010–2019: Loan moves and fringe appearances

After impressing in a trial and being approved for a work permit, Martinez was formally registered as an Arsenal player in July 2010.

After injuries to Ryan Clarke and Wayne Brown, and the termination of Connor Ripley's loan, Martínez went on emergency loan to Oxford United, making his debut in the Football League in their final game of the season against Port Vale in League Two on 5 May 2012; Port Vale won 3–0. Later that year, Martinez was named on the Arsenal substitute bench for their fixtures away at Stoke City on 26 August and against Liverpool on 2 September, as cover for the injured Wojciech Szczęsny and Łukasz Fabiański, respectively. On 26 September, he made his Arsenal debut in a 6–1 home win against Coventry City in the third-round of the League Cup. He made his second Arsenal appearance in the following round in a 7–5 win away at Reading. Martínez subsequently transferred to Championship side Sheffield Wednesday on an emergency 28-day loan on 15 October 2013. He made his debut for Wednesday on 23 November, against Yorkshire rivals Huddersfield Town. Martínez's loan was eventually extended until the end of the season.

After returning to Arsenal, Martínez was an unused substitute as Arsenal won the Community Shield on 10 August 2014, with a 3–0 win over Manchester City at Wembley Stadium. He made his debut in the Champions League soon after, helping Arsenal defeat Anderlecht 2–1 in the group stage. He then made his Premier League debut as a 2nd half substitute, replacing the injured Szczęsny against Manchester United at the Emirates Stadium on 22 November. With injuries to backup goalkeeper David Ospina, Martínez played his second Champions League game on 26 November, keeping a clean sheet in a 2–0 victory over Borussia Dortmund. His "faultless" performance in the match led to him being named in the UEFA Team of the Week. He made his first Premier League start on 29 November against West Bromwich Albion, and also started against Southampton four days later; he kept two clean sheets as Arsenal won both matches 1–0.

On 20 March 2015, Martínez joined Championship club Rotherham United on an emergency loan until the end of the season. He made his debut the following day against South Yorkshire rivals Sheffield Wednesday, conceding two added-time goals in a 3–2 home defeat. On 2 August, Martínez was an unused substitute as new signing Petr Čech played for Arsenal in the 2015 FA Community Shield, a 1–0 win over rivals Chelsea. On 11 August, he joined Championship side Wolverhampton Wanderers on a season-long loan. After making 15 appearances in the opening months of the campaign, he suffered a thigh injury that kept him out of contention for several months and was unable to regain his starting place afterwards. He spent the 2016–17 season at his parent club, for whom he played 5 games during the campaign, including a Premier League appearance against West Ham United.

On 2 August 2017, he joined La Liga side Getafe on a season-long loan, and on 23 January 2019, he was loaned to Championship side Reading until the end of the season. At Reading, Martínez made his debut on 29 January against Bolton Wanderers, and won the man of the match award against Aston Villa a few days later.

2019–2020: Breakthrough and departure
With Bernd Leno being taken off injured during the first half of Arsenal's defeat to Brighton & Hove Albion on 20 June 2020, Martínez came off the bench to make his first Premier League appearance since the 2016–17 season. This led to Martínez seeing out the season as first choice goalkeeper at the club and was highly commended for a string of stellar performances, with former Arsenal striker Ian Wright describing him as "commanding" and as having played "brilliantly" during his extended spell in the team. On 1 August, Martínez was selected to start in the FA Cup Final against Chelsea, he went on to make some crucial saves to help Arsenal win their 14th FA Cup; after lifting the trophy he was visibly emotional and reduced to tears.

Martínez started in the Community Shield clash against Liverpool on 29 August, which Arsenal won on penalties. Following the match, there was much speculation that Martínez would leave the club with Bernd Leno returning and the player himself stated that he either wanted to stay at the club and be first-choice keeper or leave on a permanent basis. With reported interest from a number of Premier League and foreign clubs, including Aston Villa and Brighton & Hove Albion, Martínez was left out of the squad to face Fulham on the opening day of the league season.

Aston Villa
On 16 September 2020, Martínez transferred to fellow Premier League club Aston Villa in a deal worth up to £20 million. He signed a four-year contract. On 21 September, Martínez made his debut for Villa, saving a penalty from John Lundstram in a 1–0 home win against Sheffield United. In his first season at Aston Villa, Martínez equalled Brad Friedel's club record for clean sheets in a Premier League season, with 15. He was also named Aston Villa Supporters' Player of the Season.

On 21 January 2022, Martínez signed a three-year contract extension which will see him contracted to Villa until the end of the 2026–27 season. On 27 July, ahead of the new season, Martínez was named one of the two Aston Villa vice-captains, alongside Diego Carlos.

International career
Martínez was called up to the Argentina senior squad to replace Oscar Ustari to face Nigeria in June 2011. He received his second senior call up against Germany and Ecuador on 9 and 13 October 2019; he was an unused substitute for both friendly matches.

Martínez made his international debut on 3 June 2021, in a 1–1 draw with Chile in a 2022 FIFA World Cup qualification match. He subsequently made his competitive debut in a major tournament on 14 June, once again in a 1–1 draw against the same opponent in his side's opening match of the 2021 Copa América at the Estádio Olímpico Nilton Santos in Brazil. In the 57th minute, he saved a penalty from Arturo Vidal, but he failed to prevent Eduardo Vargas from scoring on the rebound. On 6 July, Martínez saved three spot kicks in a 3–2 penalty shootout victory for Argentina over Colombia in the semi-final of the tournament. He went on to finish the tournament with a clean sheet in the 1–0 victory over Brazil in the final. Martínez was also awarded the 2021 Copa América's Golden Glove award as the best keeper of the tournament for his performances.

On 1 June 2022, Martínez kept a clean sheet as Argentina won 3–0 against reigning European Champions Italy at Wembley Stadium in the 2022 Finalissima. Martínez was included in Argentina's squad for the 2022 FIFA World Cup in Qatar, and played in each of his team's games. He saved two penalties in a shoot-out against the Netherlands in the quarter final, helping his team make it to the last four. In the final, Martínez saved a shot from a 1 on 1 with Randal Kolo Muani in the last minute of extra time to force the match to a penalty shootout. He later saved a penalty from Kingsley Coman in the penalty shootout, helping Argentina win the tournament via a 4–2 shootout victory after the game had ended in a 3–3 draw after extra time. He won the Golden Glove award for his performances in the tournament. Martínez also won the 2022 The Best FIFA Men's Goalkeeper award.

Martínez created controversy after winning the Golden Glove during the 2022 FIFA World Cup award ceremony; he put the trophy to his groin and pointed towards the audience, and then emphatically waved it in the air. It generated a stir, and some media outlets reported that he had made a vulgar gesture. Addressing this, Martinez said he had done this gesture due to the French fans booing him. He also led a conga-line of Argentine players at the locker room making fun of French player Kylian Mbappé. During the celebrations in Buenos Aires, fans presented him with a baby-doll with the face of Mbappé. Several international media outlets criticized him for these actions, and many accused him of lacking sportsmanship.

Personal life
He is nicknamed "Dibu" (abbreviation of Dibujo, Spanish for Drawing), after an animated character in the Argentine telenovela Mi familia es un dibujo. Martinez was given the nickname as a young player by former goalkeeper and goalkeeper coach Miguel Angel Santoro at Club Atlético Independiente, at a time when the series was highly popular.

Martínez has been married to Amanda "Mandinha" (née Gama) since 2017. The couple have a son, Santi, and a daughter, Ava.

On 22 December 2022, after winning the 2022 FIFA World Cup with the national team, Martínez was given a welcome reception at Las Toscas resort, in his native city of Mar del Plata. According to the local press, there was an attendance of more than 150,000 people, both locals and tourists.

Career statistics

Club

International

Honours
Arsenal
FA Cup: 2019–20
FA Community Shield: 2014, 2015, 2020

Argentina
FIFA World Cup: 2022
Copa América: 2021
CONMEBOL–UEFA Cup of Champions: 2022

Individual
 The Best FIFA Men's Goalkeeper: 2022
FIFA World Cup Golden Glove: 2022
Copa América Golden Glove: 2021
Aston Villa Player of the Season: 2020–21
Copa América Team of the Tournament: 2021

References

External links

Profile at the Aston Villa F.C. website

1992 births
Living people
Sportspeople from Mar del Plata
Argentine footballers
Association football goalkeepers
Arsenal F.C. players
Oxford United F.C. players
Sheffield Wednesday F.C. players
Rotherham United F.C. players
Wolverhampton Wanderers F.C. players
Getafe CF footballers
Reading F.C. players
Aston Villa F.C. players
English Football League players
Premier League players
FA Cup Final players
La Liga players
Argentina youth international footballers
Argentina under-20 international footballers
Argentina international footballers
2021 Copa América players
2022 FIFA World Cup players
Copa América-winning players
FIFA World Cup-winning players
Argentine expatriate footballers
Expatriate footballers in England
Expatriate footballers in Spain
Argentine expatriate sportspeople in England
Argentine expatriate sportspeople in Spain